George Kerevan (born 28 September 1949) is a Scottish journalist, economist, and politician. He was the Scottish National Party (SNP) Member of Parliament (MP) for East Lothian from 2015, until he lost his seat at the snap 2017 general election.

Early life and education
Born in Glasgow, Kerevan was educated at Kingsridge Secondary School in Drumchapel and the University of Glasgow, graduating with a First-class MA degree in political economy.

Career
Kerevan held academic posts at Napier College, including Senior Lecturer in Economics, from 1975 to 2000, specialising in energy economics. He was associate editor of The Scotsman from 2000 to 2009, and was the chief executive of What If Productions (Television) Ltd. He is co-organiser of the Prestwick World Festival of Flight.

Political career
Kerevan was a member of the International Marxist Group, a Trotskyist group, between 1972 and 1983. He later served as a Labour councillor in Edinburgh from 1984 to 1996. In 1996, he left Labour to join the Scottish National Party. He went on to stand unsuccessfully as the SNP candidate for Edinburgh East at the 2010 UK general election, as well as an SNP candidate in the Lothian region in the 2011 Scottish Parliament election.

Kerevan eventually stood successfully as the SNP candidate for East Lothian at the 2015 UK general election. He won 25,104 votes, a majority of 6,803, and unseated the then-incumbent Labour MP Fiona O'Donnell. He was a member of the House of Commons Treasury Select Committee. He subsequently lost his seat in the 2017 snap election to Martin Whitfield of the Labour Party, who won with a majority of 3,083 votes over Kerevan.

In March 2021, Kerevan defected from the SNP to the Alba Party.

Selected works
He is the co-author, with Alan Cochrane, of Scottish Independence: Yes or No, published in April 2014.

 Arguments within Scottish Marxism, in The Bulletin of Scottish Politics No. 2, Spring 1981, pp. 111 - 133
 The Collapse of the Scottish Economy, in Dunion, Kevin (ed.), Radical Scotland, February/March 1983, pp. 6 - 8,

References

External links
 
 Column at The Scotsman
 

1949 births
Academics of Edinburgh Napier University
Alumni of the University of Glasgow
Aviation journalists
Councillors in Edinburgh
Energy economists
International Marxist Group members
Living people
Members of the Parliament of the United Kingdom for Scottish constituencies
Politicians from Glasgow
Scottish columnists
Scottish economists
Scottish journalists
Scottish Labour councillors
Scottish National Party MPs
UK MPs 2015–2017
Alba Party politicians